Marian "Marek" Spychalski (6 December 1906 – 7 June 1980) was a Polish architect in pre-war Poland, and later, military commander and a communist politician. During World War II he belonged to the Polish underground forces operating within Poland and was one of the leaders of the People's Guard, then People's Army. He held several key political posts during the PRL era, most notably; Chairman of the Council of State, mayor of Warsaw and Defence Minister.

Biography

Early career

Born to a working-class family in Łódź, Spychalski graduated from the Faculty of Architecture of the Warsaw University of Technology in 1931. That same year he joined the KPP, and kept his membership after the Nazi-Soviet invasion, when in 1942 KPP became the Polish Workers' Party, renamed in 1948 as the Polish United Workers' Party. Before World War II, he practised architecture and won several national and international competitions and awards.

World War Two

In 1943 as part of the subversive Soviet effort to destroy the independent Polish resistance movement associated with the Polish government-in-exile, he denounced to the Gestapo various members of those resistance organizations.

Polish People's Republic
After World War II, he held a number of offices in the government of Poland, one of his first being mayor of Warsaw (18 September 1944 – March 1945), with the war still in progress. Among other posts, he was a long-time member of the parliament, a close friend of Władysław Gomułka, and from 1945 to 1948 was both Deputy Minister of Defense and a member of the Politburo of the Polish United Workers' Party.

He was removed from his remaining political posts in 1949 and then in 1950 imprisoned as part of the Stalinist purges of social-democrats in 1949–1953, where he was accused of anti-Soviet tendencies akin to Titoism. In 1951 he appeared in a show trial where he was instructed to deliver official (and false) testimony against Gomułka. He was only released in the mass release of political prisoners in April 1956, and subsequently reinstated in the Polish United Workers' Party.

With Gomułka's rehabilitation and return to power in 1956, Spychalski became the Polish Minister of Defence. In 1959 he again became a member of the Politburo, and in 1963 he was promoted to Field Marshal.

In 1968 during the anti-Zionist purge of the army, at Gomułka's request he left the Polish Army and his job as Minister of Defense, to assume civilian posts as President of the Front of National Unity, and from 10 April 1968 to 23 December 1970 as Chairman of the Council of State – the de facto head of state of Poland – the Council being the de jure executive authority in the People's Republic, although some considered the post to be mostly symbolic.

Descent from power
As head of state, Spychalski was nearly assassinated at Karachi airport in Pakistan on 1 November 1970 during the welcoming ceremonies. The Gettysburg Times informed that an anti-communist Islamic fundamentalist Feroze Abdullah drove a lorry at high speed into the Polish delegation, narrowly missing his intended target but killing the Polish Deputy Foreign Minister Zygfryd Wolniak (48) and three Pakistani representatives including the Deputy Director of the Intelligence Bureau, Chaudhri Mohammed Nazir, and two photographers.

Spychalski lost his posts as close associate of Gomułka, when Edward Gierek replaced Gomułka as First Secretary of the Polish United Workers' Party during the 1970 Polish protests throughout December. Spychalski retired and wrote a four volume memoir which is now in the archives of the Hoover Institution in California. He died on 7 June 1980, survived by his wife Barbara who also wrote about him.

Honours and awards

 Knight's Cross of the Virtuti Militari
 Order of the Builders of People's Poland (1961)
 Commander's Cross with Star of the Order of Polonia Restituta, also the Commander's Cross
 Cross of Grunwald, 2nd and 3rd Classes
 Order of the Banner of Labour, 1st Class
 Partisan Cross (12 June 1946)
 Medal for Oder, Neisse and Baltic
 Medal for Participation in the Battle of Berlin
 Medal for Warsaw 1939–1945
 Medal of Victory and Freedom 1945
 Gold Medal "in the Service of the Armed Forces of the Homeland"
 Gold Medal "for his contribution to national defense"
 Medal "For the Capture of Berlin"
 Badge "Meritorious activist ORMO"
 Order of Lenin (USSR) (1968)
 Medal "For the Victory over Germany in the Great Patriotic War 1941–1945" (USSR)
 Grand Cross of the Order of the Crown (Belgium)
 Grand Cross of the Order of the White Rose (Finland)

References

1906 births
1980 deaths
Architects from Łódź
People from Piotrków Governorate
Communist Party of Poland politicians
Polish Workers' Party politicians
Members of the Politburo of the Polish United Workers' Party
Heads of state of the Polish People's Republic
Members of the State National Council
Members of the Polish Sejm 1947–1952
Members of the Polish Sejm 1957–1961
Members of the Polish Sejm 1961–1965
Members of the Polish Sejm 1965–1969
Members of the Polish Sejm 1969–1972
Marshals of Poland
Polish People's Army generals
Armia Ludowa members
People detained by the Polish Ministry of Public Security
Recipients of the Virtuti Militari (1943–1989)
Recipients of the Order of the Builders of People's Poland
Knights of the Virtuti Militari
Commanders with Star of the Order of Polonia Restituta
Recipients of the Order of the Cross of Grunwald, 2nd class
Recipients of the Order of the Cross of Grunwald, 3rd class
Recipients of the Order of the Banner of Work
Recipients of the Order of Lenin
Grand Crosses of the Order of the Crown (Belgium)
Mayors of Warsaw